IMM-101 is an immunomodulatory drug that is being studied to see if it is useful in chemotherapy. It consists of heat-killed Mycobacterium obuense bacteria. It may have relatively few side effects compared to other drugs.

References 

Experimental cancer drugs
Chemotherapy